In astronomy, a deep field is an image of a portion of the sky taken with a very long exposure time, in order to detect and study faint objects. The depth of the field refers to the apparent magnitude or the flux of the faintest objects that can be detected in the image. Deep field observations usually cover a small angular area on the sky, because of the large amounts of telescope time required to reach faint flux limits. Deep fields are used primarily to study galaxy evolution and the cosmic evolution of active galactic nuclei, and to detect faint objects at high redshift. Numerous ground-based and space-based observatories have taken deep-field observations at wavelengths spanning radio to X-rays. 

The first deep-field image to receive a great deal of public attention was the Hubble Deep Field, observed in 1995 with the WFPC2 camera on the Hubble Space Telescope. Other space telescopes that have obtained deep-field observations include the Chandra X-ray Observatory, the XMM-Newton Observatory, the Spitzer Space Telescope, and the James Webb Space Telescope.

Table
The following table gives a partial list of deep-field observations taken since 1995.

See also

List of Hubble anniversary images

References

Astronomy image articles
Astronomical surveys
Image galleries